The 2nd Cricket World Cup was played in England on six different venues. A total of 15 matches were played in 1979 Cricket World Cup including 2 Semifinals and a Final match.

Umpires
8 umpires were selected to supervise 16 matches of the World Cup. All of them belonged to the England.
The first semifinal was supervised by John Langridge and Ken Palmer while Lloyd Budd and David Constant supervised the second semifinal.

Dickie Bird and Barrie Meyer were elected to stand in the final.

References

External links
 Cricket World Cup 1979 from Cricinfo

Knockout stage
Sports competitions in England
1979 in cricket
1979 in English cricket
International cricket competitions from 1975–76 to 1980

mr:१९७५ क्रिकेट विश्वचषक बाद फेरी